Jane Hayward may refer to: 

 Jane Hayward (Glee), a character in the musical comedy-drama television series Glee
 Jane Hayward (actress), British actress